David Leonard Loew (October 5, 1897 – March 25, 1973) was an American film producer.

Biography
He and his twin brother, Arthur Loew were born on October 5, 1897, to MGM founder Marcus Loew.

After being elected to the board of directors of Loew's, Inc., in 1922, he resigned from the studio in 1935 to launch an independent production career. In the early 1940s, he formed an independent production company with Albert Lewin and Stanley Kramer. At the end of World War II, he formed Enterprise Productions with actor John Garfield and former Warner Bros. publicity chief Charles Einfeld.

He died on March 25, 1973, at the University of California, Los Angeles Medical Center in Los Angeles, California. He was survived by his wife, Hilda.

Filmography
When's Your Birthday? (1937)
Riding on Air (1937)
Fit for a King (1937)
Wide Open Faces (1938)
The Gladiator (1938)
Flirting with Fate (1938)
So Ends Our Night (1941)
The Moon and Sixpence (1942)
The Southerner (1945)
A Night in Casablanca (1946)
Toccata and Fugue; short film (1946)
The Private Affairs of Bel Ami (1947)
Enchanted Lake (1947)
Arch of Triumph (1948)

References

External links
 

1897 births
1973 deaths
American film producers